Vladimir Heerik (born 27 March 1949) is an Estonian athletics competitor and coach.

He was born in Vorkuta, Russia. In 1975, he graduated from the University of Tartu's Faculty of Psychology and from the same institution in 1991, with a master's degree in psychology.

He began athletics training in 1957. He is multiple-times Estonian champion in different running disciplines. He has represented Estonian national athletics team 30 times.

1982–1998 he was the director of Tartu Tamme Stadium.

Personal best:
 1500 m: 3.51,7 (later that 1977)
 5000 m: 14.20,6 (later that 1977)
 10 000 m: 29.11,5 (later that 1977)

References

Living people
1949 births
Estonian male middle-distance runners
Estonian male long-distance runners
Estonian sports coaches
University of Tartu alumni
People from Vorkuta